Lupinus arizonicus, the Arizona lupine, is a flowering plant in the legume family Fabaceae, native to the Mojave and Sonoran Deserts of North America, where it can be found growing in open places and sandy washes below  elevation. It is common around Joshua Tree National Park and Death Valley National Park in California.

The flowers are magenta to dark pink, 7–10 mm long, with 20–50 or more flowers in a tall spike.

References

External links
Jepson Flora Project: Lupinus arizonicus
USDA Plants Profile
Photo gallery
Mojave Desert Wildflowers, Jon Mark Stewart, 1998, pg. 136

arizonicus
Flora of Arizona
Flora of California
Flora of Nevada
Flora of Northwestern Mexico
Flora of the Sonoran Deserts
Flora of the California desert regions
Natural history of the Colorado Desert
Natural history of the Mojave Desert
Flora without expected TNC conservation status